Showcase Mall is a shopping center on the Las Vegas Strip in Paradise, Nevada.

History

After the 1989 announcement of plans for the MGM Grand hotel and casino, attorney Bob Unger recognized the investment potential of an adjacent property where he was handling an eviction case. Unger approached his friend, banker Barry Fieldman, for financing, and the two partnered to form Makena Development Corp. in 1992. Makena purchased Island Plaza, a small shopping center on the site that would become the southern part of Showcase Mall. They then beat out MGM in an effort to purchase two gas stations to the north of Island Plaza.

Forest City Enterprises, a national real estate developer with interests in Las Vegas including the Galleria at Sunset mall, signed on to provide additional funding and expertise to the project, taking a 20% ownership stake.

The first business at the mall, the Official All Star Cafe, opened on December 15, 1996.  An eight-screen United Artists Theater opened in March 1997.

The second phase, south of the original building, opened in 2000, featuring a gift shop with an interior designed to resemble the Grand Canyon.

North of the original portion of the mall, a parcel occupied by a Denny's restaurant was earmarked for a third phase of construction. In 2003, Westgate Resorts announced a $180-million plan to build a 54-story tower with over 700 timeshare units on the Denny's site. Facing strong opposition from MGM Grand and concerns from county officials about the size of the project, the plan was scaled back to 42 stories, but was ultimately rejected by the Clark County Commission.

In 2005, the developers sold the first phase of the mall for $142 million, to a partnership of San Francisco-based City Center Retail and New York investment firm Angelo Gordon & Co. The buyers also spent $30 million to acquire a leasehold interest in the Denny's site.

The mall's third phase was built in 2009 with 97,400 square feet of space, anchored by a Hard Rock Cafe and a Ross Dress For Less store. The City Center / Angelo Gordon partnership sold this portion of the mall in 2011 to Unilev Capital Corp., a California real estate investment company, for $93.5 million.

In July 2014, City Center and Angelo Gordon sold the original center section of the mall for $145 million to a partnership between the Nakash family (founders of Jordache) and investor Eli Gindi. The Nakashes and Gindi, along with home-curtains manufacturer Elyahu Cohen, then purchased the third, northern section of the mall from Unilev Capital for $139.5 million in January 2015. The Nakashes and Gindi consolidated their control of the mall in December 2015, buying the southern portion from Fieldman for $82.9 million.

A planned expansion of the mall was approved in September 2017. Earlier in the year, the Nakashes and Gindi had paid $59.5 million to purchase a building to the north of the mall, which had previously housed the Smith & Wollensky steakhouse. Plans called for the building to be demolished and replaced with a new four-story,  building. It would be anchored by Target and Burlington department stores. Both stores opened in 2020 in the new building.

Notable tenants

Adidas Performance Center — A three-story store selling sports apparel. Opened in 2004.
Aerie — A two-story lingerie store, opened in 2018.
American Eagle — A two-story flagship store for the apparel retailer, opened in 2018.
Burlington — A  discount department store. Opened in 2020 in the mall's fourth phase.
Coca-Cola Store — A two-story gift shop. Opened in 1997 as the World of Coca-Cola, a four-story facility, with the upper two floors containing a museum showcasing the history of Coca-Cola. The museum portion closed in 2000.
Designer Shoe Warehouse — A flagship store for the shoe retailer, in the mall's basement. Opened in 2018.
FlyOver — A flying theater motion simulator attraction, located in the former movie theater space at the base of the mall's parking garage. Opened in 2021.
Food court — Opened in 2003 with nine fast-food outlets.
Hard Rock Cafe — A three-story facility including a restaurant, live music venue, and gift shop. Opened in 2009.
M&M's World — A four-story store selling M&M's candy and merchandise. Opened in 1997.
Olive Garden — Italian restaurant, opened in 2021 on the third floor of the mall's fourth phase.
T-Mobile — A two-story flagship store for the mobile phone provider. Opened in 2018.
Target — A  "small-format" location of the discount retail store chain. Opened in 2020 in the mall's fourth phase.

Former tenants
GameWorks — A video arcade and restaurant. Opened in 1997 in a basement space now occupied by Marshalls. Closed in 2012.
Grand Canyon Experience — A two-story gift shop built to resemble the Grand Canyon. Opened in 2000 as part of the mall's second phase. Closed in 2017.
Official All Star Cafe — A three-story theme restaurant featuring sports memorabilia. Opened in 1996. Closed in 2000.
Tickets2Nite — A discount ticket broker located in the mall's atrium. Opened in 2002 as the first discount ticket outlet in Las Vegas, inspired by New York's TKTS booth. Moved out by 2008.
United Artists Theaters — An eight-screen movie theater, located at the base of the mall's parking garage. Opened in 1997. Closed in 2018.

References

Buildings and structures in Paradise, Nevada
Shopping malls in the Las Vegas Valley
Las Vegas Strip
Shopping malls established in 1996